Embodied writing practices are used by academics and artists to highlight the connection between writing and the body, bring consciousness to the cultural implications of academic writing, and inform an understanding of art forms as first person narrative.

Definition 
In her article "Embodied Writing: A Tool for Teaching and Learning in Dance", dance theorist Betsy Cooper defines embodied writing as:

Psychologist Rosemarie Anderson also describes embodied writing:

Practices 
Certain psychologists utilize embodied writing as a practice of putting the experience of the body into words to connect to it more deeply. Some link this to meditative practices.

In dance theory, choreographic writing (a form of embodied writing) is done by imagining words as dancing across a page.

Others use forms of yoga to more deeply connect the body to the writing.

Each of these practices aim to create more awareness of the sensation of the body in space and to think of writing as a physical act.

References 

Educational practices
Writing